Rush is an unincorporated community and a U.S. Post Office located in El Paso County, Colorado, United States.  The Rush Post Office has the ZIP Code 80833. 

Named for Christopher Rush, a homesteader from Missouri who settled there in 1907.

Education
Miami-Yoder School District 60JT serves Rush.

Geography

See also
 List of cities and towns in Colorado
 El Paso County, Colorado
 State of Colorado

References

Unincorporated communities in El Paso County, Colorado
Unincorporated communities in Colorado